Marco Johann Kreuzpaintner (born 11 March 1977) is a German film director, executive producer and screenwriter.

Career 

In 1999, he began his career in the role of German dubbing assistant for the Stanley Kubrick film Eyes Wide Shut.

In the same year, his first short film, Entering Reality, starring August Diehl attracted attention at film festivals. In 1999, he founded the production company Die Filmmanufaktur with Oliver Weiss. In 2000, he made the short film Der Atemkünstler, for which he was nominated for the Talent award First Steps, and in 2002, he made a TV pilot, Rec – Kassettenmädchen/Kassettenjungs.

In 2003, his first feature-length film, Ganz und gar, which describes the life of a young leg amputee, was released in theaters.

This was followed in 2004 with the drama Sommersturm (Summer Storm), which, according to Kreuzpaintner, resembles his own coming out as a young homosexual. Summer Storm won The German Film Award (Germany’s version of the Oscar) for Best Young Director and earned him a nomination for Best Director and Best Screenplay. The movie’s lead was also nominated for Best Actor. Distributed by Warner Bros., the film was an official selection at over 50 film festivals worldwide, including Toronto, Berlin, London, and Palm Springs.

In 2006, he wrote the screenplay for the film version of the youth novel Die Wolke.

In 2007, Trade was released internationally. The film focuses on the subject of human trafficking, forced prostitution, and modern slavery. Trade was produced by Rosilyn Heller and was originally supposed to be directed by Roland Emmerich. However, as he was involved in preparation for directing 10.000 B.C. at the time, another director was sought, and Emmerich chose Kreuzpaintner, having met him previously in Munich in 2003. Trade was the first film to have its world premiere at the United Nations Headquarters in New York City. The premiere was hosted by Sigourney Weaver, with former Secretary-General of the United Nations, Ban Ki-Moon opening the event.

On October 9, 2008, Krabat, an adaptation of the youth novel of the same name by Otfried Preußler was released, starring Robert Stadlober, Daniel Brühl and David Kross. Krabat had a successful release both in Germany and international markets, breaking the domestic record in 2008 for German Language film. Looking to expand into other areas of the filmmaking business, 2009 saw Kreuzpaintner co-found the production company Summerstorm Entertainment in Berlin, with producers Ossie von Richthofen and Fabian Wolfart. Summerstorm Entertainment continues to develop and produce English and German language films, it became a subsidary of multi-faceted media company Film House Germany in 2011.

Following a break of a few years after the release of Krabat. Kreuzpaintner developed a screenplay originally set for an English language release. However, Kreuzpaintner eventually reworked the script into a German language romantic comedy, Coming In. Following the success of Coming In, Kreuzpaintner found critical success and record ratings with T.V. movies distributed through German television network, ARD. During this time, he began the development of an original thriller.

In 2018, Amazon Prime Video commissioned, Beat, a German thriller television show created and directed by Kreuzpaintner. It starred Jannis Niewöhner as the titular character, Beat. It was released on 9 November 2018.

Following the release of Beat, Kreuzpaintner moved back to feature filmmaking. In 2019, Kreuzpaintner directed The Collini Case, a film about a young lawyer who stumbles upon a vast conspiracy while investigating a brutal murder case. The film stars Franco Nero, Elyas M'Barek, Heiner Lauterbach, Alexandra Maria Lara and Rainer Bock. Returning to television in 2020, Kreuzpaintner directed two episodes (Little Adventures & Layover) of the show Soulmates, a show created by William Bridges & Brett Goldstein. It was released on October 5, 2020 through Amazon Studios. In 2021, Kreuzpaintner joined The Lazarus Project, a project produced through Urban Myth Films and written by Joe Barton. Paapa Essidu stars as George in the lead role, a character who is forced to choose between the love of his life and the fate of the world. Kreuzpaintner directed the first four episodes and was an executive producer for the series. The show was released on 16 June 2022 through Sky Max and Now.

In 2022, an adaptation of Si Spencer's graphic novel, Bodies began production. The eight part series is produced with Netflix through Moonage Pictures, with Susie Liggat as series producer and Kreuzpaintner directing the first four episodes.

Filmography

Film

Television

Screenplay

Awards

References

External links 
 
 

1977 births
Living people
People from Rosenheim
Film people from Bavaria
German screenwriters
German male screenwriters
German film producers
German film directors
LGBT film directors